Route 64 is a highway in central Missouri with endpoints of Route 254 south of Hermitage and Route 5 in Lebanon.

Route 64 is one of the original 1922 state highways and originally ran between Preston and Collins.  It would eventually be moved further to the south with its older alignment becoming U.S. Route 54.  It would also be extended east.  It is also only one of three Missouri state highways bearing the same number as an Interstate highway in Missouri.

Major intersections

Related routes
Route 64 is the only remaining Missouri highway with lettered branches.

Route 64A

Route 64A is a  spur off Route 64 which ends in Bennett Spring State Park. When Route 64 was on its old alignment, another Route 64A went north to the Benton/Hickory county line and is now part of Route 83.

The entire route is in Bennett Spring State Park.

Route 64B

Route 64B is a  spur off Route 64 between Nemo and Pittsburg.  It ends at Pomme de Terre Lake.

References

064
Transportation in Hickory County, Missouri
Transportation in Dallas County, Missouri
Transportation in Polk County, Missouri
Transportation in Laclede County, Missouri
U.S. Route 54